Daniel Ionel Oprița (born 10 August 1981) is a Romanian professional football manager and former football player. He is the manager of Steaua București.

Club career 
Oprița began his career at FCM Reșița in 2000 in Liga II, the second tier of the Romanian football pyramid. In 2002, he moved on to Steaua București, making the step up to Liga I in the top tier of the Romanian football. Oprița spent the next seven years of his career in Bucharest winning the Divizia A in 2004–05 and 2005–06 and also the Supercupa României in 2005–06. He scored 14 goals in 93 appearances whilst at Steaua București.

On 12 April 2007, he moved across Bucharest to play for city rivals FC Dinamo București on a four-year contract. His time at the club was not a success and he played just five games without scoring. Later in 2008, he signed for FCM UTA Arad based in Arad in the west of the country.

After one season with the club Oprița terminated his contract and moved to south-east Spain to play for Lorca Deportiva CF of the Segunda División B, the third tier of the Spanish football league system. Oprița failed to settle in Spain and returned to Romania after just one month and three games. Due to the Transfer window being closed he was unable to sign for a new team until the winter break. In January 2009, he signed a six-month loan contract with FC Aarau of the Swiss Super League.

Style of play 
Despite playing as a striker, Oprița did not score many goals, he was more of a target man and his main ability was to create spaces for his teammates, where many goals are from. He was very committed while playing, and he was also technically gifted.

International career 
For Romania, Oprița was capped six times and scoring one goal. He made his debut in 2003 against Ukraine.

International goals 

Scores and results list Romania's goal tally first. "Score" column indicates the score after the player's goal.

Honours

Player
Steaua București
Romanian League Championship: 2004–05, 2005–06
Romanian Supercup: 2006
Petrolul Ploiești
Romanian Second League: 2010–11
CSU Craiova
Romanian Second League: 2013–14

Manager
Juventus București
Romanian Second League: 2016–17
Romanian Third League: 2015–16
CSA Steaua București
Romanian Third League: 2020-21
Romanian Fourth League – Bucharest: 2019–20

References

External links

 
 
 
 Swiss Football League profile

1981 births
Living people
People from Drăgănești-Olt
Romanian footballers
Association football forwards
Association football wingers
CSM Reșița players
FC Steaua București players
FC Dinamo București players
FC UTA Arad players
Lorca Deportiva CF footballers
FC Aarau players
FC Baku players
FC Petrolul Ploiești players
FC Mordovia Saransk players
CS Universitatea Craiova players
CS Sportul Snagov players
Liga I players
Segunda División B players
Swiss Super League players
Russian Premier League players
Romanian expatriate footballers
Expatriate footballers in Spain
Expatriate footballers in Switzerland
Expatriate footballers in Azerbaijan
Expatriate footballers in Russia
Romania international footballers
Romanian expatriate sportspeople in Spain
Romanian expatriate sportspeople in Switzerland
Romanian expatriate sportspeople in Azerbaijan
Romanian football managers
CS Sportul Snagov managers
ASC Daco-Getica București managers
CSM Reșița managers
FC Voluntari managers
CS Mioveni managers
CSA Steaua București managers